J. Wesley McKnight (1909 – June 6, 1968) was a Canadian television and radio personality who did play-by-play for many sports broadcasts, including serving as one of the original hosts for Hockey Night in Canada telecasts and covering the CFL Toronto Argonauts for about thirty years. He was born in Tottenham, Ontario.

He was elected to both the Hockey Hall of Fame (1986) and the Canadian Football Hall of Fame. He graduated from the University of Toronto. In 1968, he died of a heart attack at Sunnybrook Health Sciences Centre in Toronto at the age of 59.

References

External links
 Biography of Wes McKnight

1909 births
1968 deaths
Canadian sports announcers
Canadian Football League announcers
Foster Hewitt Memorial Award winners
National Hockey League broadcasters
University of Toronto alumni
Canadian Football Hall of Fame inductees